Basketball competitions at the 1979 Pan American Games in San Juan, Puerto Rico began on July 2 and continued through July 13. The preliminary rounds were held at the Canovanas Coliseum and the Cancha Pepín Cestero, while the final round was held at the Roberto Clemente Coliseum.

Medal table

Medalists

Participating nations
Eleven countries participated in the competition.

See also
 Basketball at the 1980 Summer Olympics

References

Basketball
1979
1979–80 in North American basketball
1979–80 in South American basketball
International basketball competitions hosted by Puerto Rico